Emil Kirdorf  (8 April 184713 July 1938) was a German industrialist, one of the first important employers in the Ruhr industrial sectors. He was personally awarded by Adolf Hitler the Order of the German Eagle, Nazi Germany's highest distinctions, on his 90th birthday in 1937, for his support to the Nazi Party in the late 1920s.

Biography 

Emil Kirdorf was born at Mettmann, Rhine Province. His father was a wealthy owner of a weaving mill. He had a brother named Adolf who would be his business partner during his adult life. Kirdorf volunteered a year in 1864 in Hamburg to work in an export enterprise. A year later, he worked in a textile company in Krefeld. The family's mill went bankrupt, mainly because of the management's refusal to introduce mechanical looms. Kirdorf therefore changed to mining industry in which he worked as an accountant. Following the Franco-Prussian War, he became director of Zeche Holland in 1871. Two years later, the entrepreneur Friedrich Grillo offered him the position of commercial director in the Gelsenkirchener Bergwerks-AG (GBAG) company. He became general manager of GBAG in 1893. He steered the company through the Long Depression of the 1870s, and held this position until 1926.

Under his direction, the GBAG became the largest coal mines European enterprise, and Emil Kirdorf became known as the "Chimney Baron" (Schlotbarons). Hansa, Zollern and Germania companies were integrated to GBAG under Kirdorf's leadership. Kirdorf then was one of the main founder of the Rheinisch-Westfälisches Kohlen-Syndikat employers union in 1893, member of its board of directors until 1913. 98 mine enterprises of the Ruhr belonged to this union, which tried, among others aims, to prevent dumping.

Kirdorf was also one of the founding member of the pangermanist Alldeutscher Verband league in 1891, which advocated imperialist policies. He was also a founding member of the Freie Ukraine (Free Ukraine) association, of the Kolonialverein (founded in 1882) and of the Flottenverein, a lobby in favour of extension of the Kaiserliche Marine against the British Navy.

After World War I, he was a co-founder of the Wirtschaftsvereinigung zur Förderung der geistigen Wiederaufbaukräfte (Trade Association for the Promotion of the Mental Reconstruction Forces), which subsided Alfred Hugenberg's media empire. In September 1918, it required the resignation of the Emperor Wilhelm II.

The GBAG thereafter concentrated in its coal activities. Kirdorf lost his key-position to Hugo Stinnes, to whose management policies he was vehemently opposed. Stinnes intended to make GBAG into the basis of a German trust, which was opposed by Kirdorf. After Stinnes' death in 1924, Kirdorf regained his position and entered the executive committee. In 1926, the GBAG formed the Vereinigte Stahlwerke, of which it controlled 15%. Others groups included ThyssenKrupp (26%) and PhoenixKrupp.

Kirdorf died in Mülheim in 1938.

Role during Nazi Germany 

Kirdorf was well known as a reactionary for his authoritarian and anti-democratic views. He rejected the Weimar Republic and fought the workers' movement and trade unions. According to his conceptions, the state and the entrepreneurs had to organize social order. Thus, he became an active promoter of Hitler's rise to power. He met him for the first time on 4 July 1927, and funded the NSDAP. Kirdorf then joined the NSDAP in 1927, but left it the following year, alleging as reason the influence of Gregor Strasser on the party. On 1 August 1929, he was invited as a guest of to the Nazi Party's Congress in Nuremberg. Kirdorf joined again the NSDAP in 1934. He mainly supported it in order to divert the working class from Marxism. It was also at Kirdorf's instigation that Hitler wrote Der Weg zum Wiederaufstieg in 1927, intended for exclusive distribution to, and consumption by, the leading industrialists of Germany.

On 26 October 1927, fourteen industrial employers attended a lecture by Hitler in the Kirdorfs' house. Kirdorf then organized, in August 1931, an exchange of views between Hitler and representatives of the steel industry. Joseph Goebbels noted in his diary, on 15 November 1936:

“How poor we were then. Führer tells how he once wanted to shoot himself because the bill debts grew over his head. Kirdorf helped him with 100,000 marks."

Hitler personally awarded to him, on 10 April 1937, date of Kirdorf's 90th birthday, the Order of the German Eagle, the highest distinction of the Third Reich. He benefited on 13 July 1938 from a state funeral in Gelsenkirchen, with Hitler deposing a crown on his coffin.

See also 
Nazi Germany
Hitler's rise to power

References

Sources

External links 
 Emil Kirdorf 
 article  on the website of the Route der Industriekultur 
 

1847 births
1938 deaths
People from Mettmann
People from the Rhine Province
Nazi Party politicians
Alldeutscher Verband members
Nazi propagandists
German anti-communists
Businesspeople from North Rhine-Westphalia
German lobbyists